Dorothy was a merchant ship built at Liverpool, England, in 1815. She made a number of voyages between England and India with cargo and undertook one voyage transporting convicts to New South Wales.

Career
Under the command of John Hargreaves and surgeon Robert Espie, she sailed from Cork, Ireland on 5 May 1820, stopped at Rio, leaving on the 7 July and arrived at Sydney on 25 August. She embarked 190 male convicts and had no deaths en route. The guard consisted of detachments of the 48th Regiment of Foot, under the command of Lieutenant Holdsworth of 82nd Regiment of Foot. Passengers were Mrs Espie, with three children and Mrs Holdsworth.

Dorothy departed Port Jackson on 8 November 1820, bound for Batavia and Calcutta.

Fate
While on a voyage from London to Bombay, India, she sprang a leak in late June. She was abandoned by her 25 crew on 5 July and she foundered in the South Atlantic. Her crew were rescued on 24 July by Charles Adams (United States).

Citations and references
Citations

References

1815 ships
Ships built on the River Mersey
Convict ships to New South Wales
Age of Sail merchant ships
Merchant ships of the United Kingdom
Maritime incidents in July 1833